Mae Loi is a tambon (subdistrict) of Thoeng District, in Chiang Rai Province, Thailand. In 2017 it had a population of 6,669 people.

Administration

Central administration
The tambon is divided into 13 administrative villages (mubans).

Local administration
The area of the subdistrict is covered by the subdistrict administrative organization (SAO) Mae Loi (องค์การบริหารส่วนตำบลแม่ลอย).

References

External links
Thaitambon.com on Mae Loi

Tambon of Chiang Rai province
Populated places in Chiang Rai province